Scott Edward Barrow (born 19 October 1988) is a Welsh professional footballer who plays as a left-back. He currently plays for York City in the National League.

Career
Born in Swansea, Barrow began his career with his hometown club Swansea City in their centre of excellence but was released at the age of 17 having never made an appearance for the club.

Port Talbot
After a brief spell with local side Briton Ferry Athletic, Barrow joined Welsh Premier League side Port Talbot Town. He played over 100 times for Port Talbot, winning semi-professional caps for Wales and being nominated for the 2009–10 Welsh Premier League young player of the year award.

Tamworth
Barrow joined Tamworth in 2010, making 110 league appearances in 3 years before a serious knee injury put an end to the season.

Newport County
After a season with Macclesfield, Barrow joined League Two club Newport County in July 2015. He made his football league debut on 8 August 2015 for Newport against Cambridge United. Barrow scored his first football league goal on 12 September 2015 against Morecambe. He was released by Newport on 10 May 2016 at the end of his contract.

Merthyr Town
Barrow joined Southern League Premier Division side Merthyr Town in August 2016 following his release from Newport.

Gateshead
After one season with the Martyrs he moved to Gateshead in June 2017.

York City
On 7 August 2020, Barrow followed his old manager from Gateshead, Steve Watson to York City.

Honours
Individual
Welsh Premier League Team of the Year: 2009–10

References

External links

1988 births
Living people
Footballers from Swansea
Welsh footballers
Association football defenders
Tamworth F.C. players
Macclesfield Town F.C. players
Newport County A.F.C. players
Merthyr Town F.C. players
Gateshead F.C. players
York City F.C. players
Cymru Premier players
English Football League players
National League (English football) players
Southern Football League players
Port Talbot Town F.C. players
Briton Ferry Athletic F.C. players